Robert Wayne Middaugh (born September 20, 1967) is a Canadian curler. Born in Brampton, Ontario, Middaugh resides in Victoria Harbour, Ontario. He is the only player to have won the Canadian Men's Curling Championship (known as the Brier) at three different positions: skip (1998), third (2012), and second (1993). He was inducted into the Canadian Curling Hall of Fame in 2020. He currently coaches the Anna Hasselborg rink from Sweden.

Career
Middaugh is a three-time world champion, once as second for Russ Howard in 1993, as a skip in 1998, and as third for Glenn Howard in 2012. He has competed in ten Briers — in 1991, 1992, 1993, and 1994 as Russ Howard's second, in 1998, 2001, 2005 and 2021 as a skip, and in 2012 and 2013 as third on the Glenn Howard rink — winning the title in 1993, 1998 and 2012. On top of this, Middaugh has won seven TSN Skins Games, was the World Curling Tour Money leader for three seasons and has won five World Curling Tour Players' Championships (1995, 1999, 2001, 2002 and 2013). 

In March 2007, Jon Mead was announced as the Middaugh team's replacement for Wayne's cousin Peter Corner at the third position. He left the team in April 2010 to rejoin with his former skip Jeff Stoughton.

Following the retirement of Richard Hart from the Glenn Howard rink, Howard announced that Middaugh would replace Hart as his third.
Middaugh would have immediate success with his new team, qualifying for the 2012 Tim Hortons Brier where the rink lost only one game during the event, and defeated Alberta's Kevin Koe in the final. Middaugh became the first curler to win the Brier at three different positions. In addition to the 2012 title, Middaugh was the winner of the annual Ford Hot Shots skills and shot-making competition that precedes the start of round-robin play. The team represented Ontario again at the 2013 Tim Hortons Brier, where they won a bronze medal.

Middaugh left the Howard rink in 2014, and announced his retirement from competitive curling. However he returned in time to play in the Challenge Round to qualify for the 2015 Ontario Tankard, being added as skip to Peter Corner's rink. He returned to the Howard rink for the 2015–16 curling season before breaking his leg in a skiing accident partway though the season. The team qualified for the 2016 Tim Hortons Brier, but due to the injury Middaugh was relegated to coaching the team.

Middaugh's accident resulted in his leg being broken in 11 places, two years of recovery, and multiple surgeries. It also resulted in him getting a "titanium leg". This forced him to cut his curling career short, and he moved to the world of coaching, joining the 2018 Olympic gold medallist Anna Hasselborg rink as their coach.  During the 2020–21 curling season, Middaugh's former skip Glenn Howard got into an accident of his own, while snowmobiling. Due to the accident, Middaugh joined the team to play in the 2021 Tim Hortons Brier, replacing Howard as skip. Despite his prior injury and time away from the game, Middaugh led the team to an 8–4 record, finishing in 5th place overall. After the event, Middaugh called it a "one off", stating that he could not "play a long event again".

Personal life
Middaugh works as the general manager at the Port Carling Golf & Country Club and is also the PGA of Canada golf pro. He is married to former Ontario women's champion Sherry Middaugh, and has two children.

Career statistics

Grand Slam record

Teams

Notes

References

External links
 

1967 births
Living people
Canadian male curlers
Canadian curling coaches
World curling champions
Brier champions
Canada Cup (curling) participants
Curlers from Simcoe County
Sportspeople from Brampton
Canadian male golfers